The Mortlock River is a perennial river located in the Wheatbelt region of Western Australia.

Course and features
The headwaters of the river rise near Belmunging then flow in a northerly direction, crossed by the Goldfields Road and continuing in a north-westerly direction to finally flow parallel to the Northam York Road and crossed by the Great Eastern Highway. The river is joined by three minor tributaries; Mortlock River North, Mortlock River East and Meenaar South Creek. The river discharges into the Avon River, just west of Northam. The Mortlock descends  over its  course.

Name
The river was named after the surveyor Henry Mortlock Ommanney in the 1830s. Ommanney was the first European to visit the river during an expedition through the area in 1835.

See also

 List of watercourses in Western Australia

References 

Avon River (Western Australia)